The Medal of Honor was created during the American Civil War and is the highest military decoration presented by the United States government to a member of its armed forces. Recipients must have distinguished themselves at the risk of their own life above and beyond the call of duty in action against an enemy of the United States. Because of the nature of this medal, it is commonly presented posthumously.

Of the 3,525 Medals of Honor awarded , 95 have been awarded to 94 different African-American recipients. Robert Augustus Sweeney is one of 19 men, and the only African American, to have been awarded two Medals of Honor.

A 1993 study commissioned by the United States Army investigated racial discrimination in the awarding of medals. At the time, no Medals of Honor had been awarded to black soldiers who served in World War II. After an exhaustive review of files, the study recommended that several black Distinguished Service Cross recipients be upgraded to the Medal of Honor. On January 13, 1997, President Bill Clinton awarded the Medal to seven African-American World War II veterans; of these, only Vernon Baker was still alive. On March 18, 2014, Melvin Morris, an African American Vietnam War veteran, was awarded the Medal of Honor following a review which recommended upgrading the Distinguished Service Cross he had originally earned for action in 1969. On October 17, 2018 John Canley an African-American U.S. Marine who fought in the Tet Offensive of the Vietnam War received The Medal of Honor 50 years after the heroism he displayed that earned him the Navy Cross.

19th century

American Civil War
Twenty-six African Americans earned the Medal of Honor during the American Civil War, including eight sailors of the Union Navy, fifteen soldiers of the United States Colored Troops, and three soldiers of other Army units. Fourteen African-American men earned the Medal for actions in the Battle of Chaffin's Farm, where a division of U.S. Colored Troops saw heavy action. Another four men, all sailors, earned their Medals at the Battle of Mobile Bay. William Harvey Carney was the first African American to perform an action for which a Medal of Honor was awarded, but Robert Blake was the first to actually receive the Medal (Blake's was issued in 1864, Carney did not receive his until 1900). It was common for Civil War Medals of Honor to be awarded decades after the conflict ended; in one case, Andrew Jackson Smith's Medal was not awarded until 2001, 137 years after the action in which he earned it. Smith's wait, caused by a missing battle report, is the second longest delay of the award for any recipient and the longest delay for an African American. President Obama awarded the Medal of Honor to Union Army First Lieutenant Alonzo Cushing for his actions at the Battle of Gettysburg in November 2014, making the 151 year delay it the longest between the action and receipt of the award.

Note: Notes in quotations are derived or are copied from the official Medal of Honor citation

Indian Wars
Eighteen African Americans earned the Medal of Honor during the Indian Wars of the western United States. Fourteen were "Buffalo Soldiers", members of the Army's first peacetime black regiments. The four Buffalo Soldier regiments, the 9th Cavalry, 10th Cavalry, 24th Infantry, and 25th Infantry, fought in campaigns throughout the west. The remaining four Medal of Honor recipients were U.S. Army Indian Scouts recruited from among the Black Seminoles, a group of Seminole Indians of African descent.

Note: Notes in quotations are derived or are copied in their entirety from the actual Medal of Honor citation

Spanish–American War
Six African Americans earned the Medal of Honor during the Spanish–American War: five Buffalo Soldiers of the 10th Cavalry Regiment and one United States Navy sailor. Four of the five Buffalo Soldiers received the Medal for rescuing a trapped landing party during the Battle of Tayacoba.

Note: Notes in quotations are derived or are copied in their entirety from the actual Medal of Honor citation

20th century

World War I
Freddie Stowers was the first of only two African Americans to receive the Medal of Honor for actions in World War I. Stowers had led an assault on German trenches, continuing to lead and encourage his men even after being twice wounded. Stowers died of his wounds, and was shortly afterwards recommended for the Medal of Honor; however, this recommendation was never processed. In 1990, the Department of the Army conducted a review and the Stowers recommendation was uncovered. An investigation was launched, and based on results of the investigation the award of the Medal of Honor was approved. Stowers' Medal of Honor was presented on April 24, 1991—seventy-three years after he was killed-in-action. Henry Johnson's Medal of Honor was presented on June 2, 2015-eighty five years after he died.

World War II
No African American was awarded a Medal of Honor either during World War II or immediately afterwards with respect to their actions during that conflict. This changed in 1992 when a study conducted by Shaw University and commissioned by the U.S. Dept. of Defense and the United States Army asserted that systematic racial discrimination had been present in the criteria for awarding medals during the war. After an exhaustive review of files the study recommended that several of the Distinguished Service Crosses awarded to African Americans be upgraded to the Medal of Honor. On January 13, 1997, more than fifty years after the end of the war, President Bill Clinton awarded the Medal to seven African-American World War II veterans. Vernon Baker was the only living recipient—the other six men had been killed in action or died in the intervening years.

Note: Notes in quotations are derived or are copied in their entirety from the actual Medal of Honor citation

Korean War
Two African Americans received the Medal of Honor for action in the Korean War; both were soldiers of the 24th Infantry Regiment. Despite a 1948 Executive Order commanding the integration of the military, segregated units persisted until 1954; the 24th Infantry was one of the last remaining all-black regiments, and these two men were the last African Americans to receive the Medal of Honor for actions while serving in a segregated unit.

Vietnam War
Twenty-two African Americans were awarded the Medal of Honor for actions in the Vietnam War, including James Anderson, Jr., the first African-American Marine to receive the Medal.

Note: Notes in quotations are derived or are copied in their entirety from the actual Medal of Honor citation

21st century

Iraq War 

Alwyn Crendall Cashe (July 13, 1970 – November 8, 2005) was a United States Army non-commissioned officer who was posthumously awarded the Medal of Honor for heroism in Iraq. On November 10, 2020, the United States Congress voted to upgrade Cashe’s initially awarded Silver Star to the Medal of Honor. On December 16, 2021, more than 16 years after his death at age 35, Cashe's widow, Tamara, accepted the Medal of Honor from President Joe Biden at a ceremony commemorating the actions of Cashe and two fellow soldiers for their acts in separate battles.

Note: Notes in quotations are derived or are copied in their entirety from the actual Medal of Honor citation

Non-Combat
Before World War II, the Medal of Honor could be awarded for actions not involving direct combat with the enemy; eight African Americans earned the Medal in this way, all of them sailors. Robert Augustus Sweeney received two peacetime Medals of Honor, one of only 19 men, and the only African American, to be awarded the medal twice. Most of the non-combat medals, including both of Sweeney's, were awarded for rescuing or attempting to rescue someone from drowning.

Note: Notes in quotations are derived or are copied in their entirety from the actual Medal of Honor citation

References

General

External links

 371st Regiment Monument

Medal of Honor recipients
African American
African Americans in the American Civil War